Marlis Hochbruck (born 12 June 1964) is a German applied mathematician and numerical analyst known for her research on matrix exponentials, exponential integrators, and their applications to the numerical solution of differential equations. She is a professor in the Institute for Applied and Numerical Mathematics at the Karlsruhe Institute of Technology.

Education and career
Hochbruck went to high school in Krefeld, and studied Technomathematics at the Karlsruhe Institute of Technology from 1983 to 1989. She completed her Ph.D. at Karlsruhe in 1992. Her dissertation, Lanczos und Krylov-Verfahren für nicht-Hermitesche lineare Systeme, was jointly supervised by Wilhelm Niethammer and Michael Eiermann.

After postdoctoral research at ETH Zurich, she became an assistant at the University of Würzburg in 1992, and moved to the University of Tübingen in 1994. She obtained her first professorship in 1998, in applied mathematics at the University of Düsseldorf, declining two offers of professorships at other German universities in the same year. In 2010 she returned to Karlsruhe as a professor.

As well as holding her professorship at Karlsruhe, she has been a vice president of the Deutsche Forschungsgemeinschaft since 2014.

Selected publications

References

External links
Interview with Hochbruck in Forschung magazine (in German)

1964 births
Living people
20th-century German mathematicians
Women mathematicians
Numerical analysts
Karlsruhe Institute of Technology alumni
Academic staff of Heinrich Heine University Düsseldorf
Academic staff of the Karlsruhe Institute of Technology
21st-century German mathematicians